Tom Caluwé (born 11 April 1978) is a Belgian football manager, executive, and former player. He currently serves as the sporting director of KV Mechelen.

Club career
Caluwé is a midfielder who was born in Rumst and made his debut in professional football, being part of the KV Mechelen squad in the 1996–97 season. He also played for Willem II Tilburg and FC Utrecht in the Dutch Eredivisie before joining Al-Wakrah.

International career
Caluwé represented Belgium in the 1997 FIFA World Youth Championship and he has one A-cap in which he scored.

Managerial career

KV Mechelen
In the summer 2014, Caluwé returned to KV Mechelen as an assistant coach. In September 2016, Caluwé was appointed interim head coach, where he was in charge for one game, which he won 2-0 against Sint-Truidense. In October 2017, he was appointed interim head coach once again, this time for two games, which he both lost.

In May 2018, he was promoted to Mechelen's technical sporting department, as an assistant to the clubs sporting director, Stefaan Vanroy. In the summer 2019, he was appointed sporting director of the club.

References

External links
Stats from Caluwé
Cv Tom Caluwé
Tom Caluwé at LinkedIn

1978 births
Living people
Belgian footballers
Belgium youth international footballers
Belgium international footballers
K.V. Mechelen players
Willem II (football club) players
FC Utrecht players
Belgian Pro League players
Eredivisie players
Cypriot First Division players
Qatar Stars League players
Belgian expatriate footballers
Expatriate footballers in the Netherlands
Belgian expatriate sportspeople in the Netherlands
Expatriate footballers in Qatar
Expatriate footballers in Cyprus
Belgian expatriate sportspeople in Cyprus
Al-Wakrah SC players
AEK Larnaca FC players
Association football midfielders
People from Rumst
Footballers from Antwerp Province